Fluorine (9F) has 18 known isotopes ranging from  to  (with the exception of ) and two isomers ( and ). Only fluorine-19 is stable and naturally occurring in more than trace quantities; therefore, fluorine is a monoisotopic and mononuclidic element.

All other fluorine isotopes have half-lives of less than a minute, and most of those less than a second.

List of isotopes 

|-
| 
| style="text-align:right" | 9
| style="text-align:right" | 4
| #
| 
| p ?
|  ?
| 1/2+#
|
|
|-
| 
| style="text-align:right" | 9
| style="text-align:right" | 5
| 
| []
| p ?
|  ?
| 2−
|
|
|-
| 
| style="text-align:right" | 9
| style="text-align:right" | 6
| 
| []
| p
| 
| 1/2+
|
|
|-
| 
| style="text-align:right" | 9
| style="text-align:right" | 7
| 
| []
| p
| 
| 0−
|
|
|-
| 
| style="text-align:right" | 9
| style="text-align:right" | 8
| 
| 
| β+
| 
| 5/2+
|
|
|-
| 
| style="text-align:right" | 9
| style="text-align:right" | 9
| 
| 
| β+
| 
| 1+
| Trace
|
|-
| style="text-indent:1em" | 
| colspan="3" style="text-indent:2em" | 
| 
| IT
| 
| 5+
|
|
|-
| 
| style="text-align:right" | 9
| style="text-align:right" | 10
| 
| colspan=3 align=center|Stable
| 1/2+
| colspan=2 style="text-align:center"|1
|-
| 
| style="text-align:right" | 9
| style="text-align:right" | 11
| 
| 
| β−
| 
| 2+
|
|
|-
| 
| style="text-align:right" | 9
| style="text-align:right" | 12
| 
| 
| β−
| 
| 5/2+
|
|
|-
| rowspan=2|
| rowspan=2 style="text-align:right" | 9
| rowspan=2 style="text-align:right" | 13
| rowspan=2|
| rowspan=2|
| β− (> )
| 
| rowspan=2|(4+)
| rowspan=2|
| rowspan=2|
|-
| β−n (< )
| 
|-
| rowspan=2|
| rowspan=2 style="text-align:right" | 9
| rowspan=2 style="text-align:right" | 14
| rowspan=2|
| rowspan=2|
| β− (> )
| 
| rowspan=2|5/2+
| rowspan=2|
| rowspan=2|
|-
| β−n (< )
| 
|-
| rowspan=2|
| rowspan=2 style="text-align:right" | 9
| rowspan=2 style="text-align:right" | 15
| rowspan=2|
| rowspan=2|
| β− (> )
| 
| rowspan=2|3+
| rowspan=2|
| rowspan=2|
|-
| β−n (< )
| 
|-
| rowspan=3|
| rowspan=3 style="text-align:right" | 9
| rowspan=3 style="text-align:right" | 16
| rowspan=3|
| rowspan=3|
| β−
| 
| rowspan=3|(5/2+)
| rowspan=3|
| rowspan=3|
|-
| β−n
| 
|-
| β−2n ?
|  ?
|-
| rowspan=3|
| rowspan=3 style="text-align:right" | 9
| rowspan=3 style="text-align:right" | 17
| rowspan=3|
| rowspan=3|
| β−
| 
| rowspan=3|1+
| rowspan=3|
| rowspan=3|
|-
| β−n
| 
|-
| β−2n ?
|  ?
|-
| rowspan=3 style="text-indent:1em" | 
| rowspan=3 colspan="3" style="text-indent:2em" | 
| rowspan=3 | 
| IT
| 
| rowspan=3|(4+)
| rowspan=3|
| rowspan=3|
|-
| β−n
| 
|-
| β− ?
|  ?
|-
| rowspan=3|
| rowspan=3 style="text-align:right" | 9
| rowspan=3 style="text-align:right" | 18
| rowspan=3|
| rowspan=3|
| β−n
| 
| rowspan=3|5/2+#
| rowspan=3|
| rowspan=3|
|-
| β−
| 
|-
| β−2n ?
|  ?
|-
| 
| style="text-align:right" | 9
| style="text-align:right" | 19
| 
| 
| n
| 
| (4−)
|
|
|-
| rowspan=3|
| rowspan=3 style="text-align:right" | 9
| rowspan=3 style="text-align:right" | 20
| rowspan=3|
| rowspan=3|
| β−n
| 
| rowspan=3|(5/2+)
| rowspan=3|
| rowspan=3|
|-
| β−
| 
|-
| β−2n ?
|  ?
|-
| rowspan=3|
| rowspan=3 style="text-align:right" | 9
| rowspan=3 style="text-align:right" | 22
| rowspan=3|#
| rowspan=3|# [> ]
| β− ?
|  ?
| rowspan=3|5/2+#
| rowspan=3|
| rowspan=3|
|-
| β−n ?
|  ?
|-
| β−2n ?
|  ?
|-

Fluorine-18

Of the unstable nuclides of fluorine,  has the longest half-life, . It decays to  via β+ decay. For this reason  is a commercially important source of positrons. Its major value is in the production of the radiopharmaceutical fludeoxyglucose, used in positron emission tomography in medicine.

Fluorine-18 is the lightest unstable nuclide with equal odd numbers of protons and neutrons, having 9 of each. (See also the "magic numbers" discussion of nuclide stability.)

Fluorine-19

Fluorine-19 is the only stable isotope of fluorine. Fluorine-19 is NMR-active with a spin of 1/2+, so it is used in fluorine-19 NMR spectroscopy.

Fluorine-20
Fluorine-20 is an unstable isotope of fluorine.

Fluorine-21
Fluorine-21, as with fluorine-20, is also an unstable isotope of fluorine.

Isomers

Only two nuclear isomers (long-lived excited nuclear states), fluorine-18m and fluorine-26m, have been characterized. This is less than the decay half-life of any of the fluorine radioisotope nuclear ground states except for mass numbers 14–16, 28, and 31.

External links
Information on Fluorine-21 from Wolframalpha.com
Information on Fluorine-20 from Wolframalpha.com

References 

 
Fluorine
Fluorine